Stanleyville is an unincorporated community in Washington County, in the U.S. state of Ohio.

History
Thomas Stanley built the first mill at Stanleyville around 1811. The community that sprang was named for pioneer Thomas Stanley. A post office called Stanleyville was established in 1878, and remained in operation until 1933.

References

Unincorporated communities in Washington County, Ohio
Unincorporated communities in Ohio